Zogam (or Land of Zo People) known as Zoland, Lushai Hills, Kuki Hills,  lies in the northwest corner of the Mainland Southeast Asia landmass. This is the traditional ancestry homeland of the Zo people or Zomi who lived in this area before the colonial period under British rulership.
Regions of Southeast Asia

Culture 

One Zo folksong delineates the area of Zogam as follows:
Penlehpi leh Kangtui minthang,
A tua tong Zota kual sung chi ua;
Khang Vaimang leh tuan a pupa
Tongchiamna Kangtui minthang aw

Translation:
(The famous Penlehpi and Kangtui
Between the two is the Zomi country
The Southern King and our forefathers
Made an agreement at the famous Kangtui)

This old folk song tells of the area of the Zomi ancestral homeland, for Penlehpi is a Burmese word for the Bay of Bengal and Kangtui is identified with Tuikang (Chindwin River).

Preferred book: "The Untold Story of Zomi" (T. Zokhai, 2018).

See also

 Bamar
 Headquarter Veng
 Separatist movements of India
 Zale'n-gam

Endnotes

External links
Zogam.com
English-Tedim Dictionary
Zolai-English Dictionary
Zomi Daily
History of the ZOMI ethnic group, re-unification movement, organization, land and people
News Portal from Lamka, one of the most important Zo-inhabited town in Manipur, India
Laibu Saal - Zomi eLibrary
Zomi Siamsin Universities, Myanmar
The Zomi Social Network
"ZO History and Origin, the Mizo, Kuki, Chin: The Origin, Settelement, Wars, Resistance, Zo People Location, Culture, Language, Religion"

Geography of India
Geography of Myanmar
Proposed countries
Independence movements
Indigenous peoples of Asia
Disputed territories in Asia
Geography of Chittagong Division